Kristaps Veksa (born 30 January 1994) is a Latvian male  BMX rider, representing his nation at international competitions. 
He started to race BMX at 1999. At the moment he is a BMX Trainer in Germany and also compete in international events like BMX and Pumptrack World championship races. 
In 2021 He was also first time competing in Ninja Warrior Germany and Ninja Warrior All Stars.

Best results

1st in Latvian Championship Multiple times

2002 - 2nd place European Championship round Netherland (Boys 8)

2002 - 3rd place European Championships (Boys 8)

2004 - 7th place European Championships (Boys 10)

2010 - 2nd place European Championships (Boys 16)

2012 - 1st  place Euro Cup Round in Switzerland (Junior Men)

2013 - 4th place Euro Cup Round Latvia (Elite men)

2016 - 3rd place Euro cup round Germany (Elite men) 

2016 - 3rd place European Cup Overall (Elite Men)

2016 - 6th place European Championships TT (Elite men)

2021 - Ninja Warrior Germany Semi Finalist

2021 - 1st place Red Bull UCI Pump Track Belgium Qualifier

2021 - 6th place Red Bull UCI Pump Track World Championships

2022 - Ninja Warrior Germany All Star Participant

2022 - European Championships 5th place (Men 25-29)

2022 - 1st place Red Bull UCI Pump Track Czech Worlds Qualifier

2022 - 11th place Red Bull UCI Pump Track World Championships Chile

Best results as a trainer

European Cup Final 2nd & 3rd (M. Dubinskis)

European Cup Final 5th (B. Nötzel)

European Cup final 6th (T. Ernins)

European Cup final 7th (T. Plath)

German National Champion (K. Jachens)

German National Silver & Bronze (B. Nötzel)

Latvian National Champion (M. Dubinskis)

German National Champion (E. Wachtel)

German National Bronze (M. König)

German National Bronze (I. Henke)

External links
https://www.veksatraining.com/
 
 

1994 births
Living people
BMX riders
Latvian male cyclists
Place of birth missing (living people)